Embelia is a genus of climbing shrubs once placed in the family Myrsinaceae, which is now included in the Primulaceae. There are about 130 species which occur in tropical and subtropical areas across a wide range including Africa and Madagascar and from eastern Asia to the Pacific Islands as well as Australia including:

Embelia angustifolia (A. DC.) A. DC.
Embelia australiana (F.Muell.) F.M.Bailey - native to New South Wales and Queensland in Australia
Embelia basaal (Roem. & Schult.) A. DC.
Embelia caulialata S.T.Reynolds
Embelia curvinervia S.T.Reynolds
Embelia demissa Cordem.
Embelia disticha Fletcher
Embelia floribunda Wall.
Embelia grandifolia Fletcher
Embelia grayi S.T.Reynolds 
Embelia laeta (L.) Mez.
Embelia longifolia (Benth.) Hemsl. 
Embelia macrocarpa King & Gamble 
Embelia oblongifolia Hemsl.
Embelia pulchella Mez. 
Embelia ribes Burm. f. - false black pepper, white-flowered embelia
Embelia ruminata (E.Mey. ex A.DC.) Mez
Embelia schimperi Vatke 
Embelia sessiliflora Kurz.  
Embelia tsjeriam-cottam (Roem. & Schult.) A. DC.

References

Primulaceae
Primulaceae genera
Taxa named by Nicolaas Laurens Burman